Jacksonia horrida is a species of leguminous plant occurring in Southwest Australia on wetter sandy soil and coastal dune systems. It bears yellow and orange to red flowers and may be prostrate or erect to a height of 2.5 metres. The distribution range extends south of Perth, occurring in higher rainfall coastal regions until reaching the west of the Esperance Plains.

References 

horrida
Mirbelioids
Fabales of Australia
Rosids of Western Australia
Taxa named by Augustin Pyramus de Candolle